Ould Lamine Fares Abdallah  (born 1929) is a French retired long-distance runner who competed in the 1952 Summer Olympics.

References

External links

1929 births
Possibly living people
Olympic athletes of France
Athletes (track and field) at the 1952 Summer Olympics
French male long-distance runners
Moroccan male long-distance runners
20th-century French people